Because may refer to:
 Because, a subordinating grammatical conjunction
 Causality, the process of making something happen; a relationship between events
 ∵, a logical symbol meaning because
 Because (film), a British film directed by Sidney Morgan
 Because, a 1990 film written and directed by Tom Tykwer
 BECAUSE (Conference), a conference for bisexual and bi+ people

In music:
 "Because" (1902 song), a popular song by Guy d'Hardelot and Edward Teschemacher, recorded by many artists
 "Because" (The Beatles song)
 "Because" (Boyzone song)
 "Because" (The Dave Clark Five song)
 "Because" (Demis Roussos song)
 "Because" (Jessica Mauboy song)
 Because, an album by The Nylons
 , a song by Dreamcatcher from Summer Holiday

See also